"It's Only Love'" is a 1969 song by B. J. Thomas from his LP Young and In Love. Elvis Presley made the song a top hit in the UK, reaching No. 3 in 1980.

Thomas' original of "It's Only Love" was released in the spring of 1969. It became a modest hit in the United States: Billboard No. 45, Cash Box No. 28 and AC No. 19, while peaking at No. 24 in Canada.

Elvis Presley cover 
"It's Only Love" was covered two and a half years later by Elvis Presley in the fall of 1971, and released as a single along with "The Sound of Your Cry" on the B-side. Accompanying vocals were provided by the Imperials.

According to the Elvis Presley official website: "Another double-ballad selection, another Elvis pick, another sales dud. 'It's Only Love' was a legitimate listener-friendly stab at the pop market (by Mark James, author of 'Suspicious Minds'), and Elvis put real effort into it. But it sold no more than 1968’s 'A Little Less Conversation', the previous low for a regular-issue Elvis single."

In the United States, "It's Only Love" reached No. 51 on Billboard Hot 100 for the week of November 6, 1971. It also charted on the Billboard Easy Listening chart.

In 1980, it was released in some countries as a single with "Beyond the Reef" on the B-side. In the UK Singles Chart the single charted as "It's Only Love / Beyond the Reef" (double-A-sided), peaking at No. 3 on the week of August 30, 1980. As of August 2017, the single "It's Only Love" / "Beyond The Reef" is Presley's nineteenth most selling single in the UK.

Also the song "It's Only Love" was included in the 1980 box set Elvis Aron Presley (on the record 8 titled "Lost Singles").

Charts 
B. J. Thomas

Elvis Presley

Certifications 
Elvis Presley version

References

External links 
  (B.J. Thomas)
  (Elvis Presley)

1969 songs
1969 singles
1971 singles
1980 singles
B. J. Thomas songs
Elvis Presley songs
Scepter Records singles
RCA Records singles
Songs written by Mark James (songwriter)
Songs written by Steve Tyrell